Frigga quintensis is a species of spider from the genus Frigga.

References

Salticidae